The Jut Art Museum (JAM) is an art museum in Da'an District, Taipei, Taiwan. It is managed and operated by the Jut Foundation for Arts and Architecture (JFAA).

Mission 
Jut Land Development's 30th anniversary, and the Jut Foundation for Arts and Architecture (JFAA)'s 10th birthday, culminates in the establishment of the Jut Art Museum (JAM) in 2016. It is a milestone commemorating the history of Taiwan's architectural aesthetics.

JAM anticipates to act as a new form of platform, catalyst and think tank devoted to corporate social responsibility fulfillment and addressing the societal dynamics of the 21st century. JAM also anticipates to carry on the legacy of "A Better Tomorrow" that defines much of JFAA's work, to become the first museum in Taiwan that is focused on the issues of "future" and "city."

Vision 
The Jut Art Museum (JAM), located in the heart of Taipei, is also where the Jut Foundation's debut exhibition of "Museum of Tomorrow" is held. After ten years of circuit shows across the city, the exhibition is now back to where it all started, becoming a "showpiece in the heartland of the city and urban inhabitation."

As an up-and-coming art establishment, JAM serves to explore what our future might hold, and transdisciplinary issues. The curation process of JAM is three-pronged: " future," "urban architecture," and "contemporary art."

Japanese architect Jun Aoki is tasked with spacing designs of JAM. The identification system is developed by Atsuki Kikuchi. This is their first museum collaboration project in Taiwan. JAM – a statement of both sophistication yet cutting-edge conception – is downtown's new architectural and art landmark; and it is poised at remaking and bringing new energy into Taipei's cityscape.

Architecture
The interior space of the Jut Art Museum (JAM) is conceived by Japanese architect Jun Aoki, while Atsuki Kikuchi is responsible for the visual identity system design. In order to connect the world outside of JAM with the space inside, Jun Aoki draws individuals from the bustling city to the tranquility of the museum within. The first floor as a buffer zone of sorts with greenery scattered throughout. It helps visitors unwind and prepare their minds as they unhurriedly head toward the displays on the second floor.

The JAM logo designed by Atsuki Kikuchi incorporates the idea of calligraphy. The letters in the museum’s name JUT resemble Asian script which convey a feeling of rhythm, suggesting JAM’s twin roles of passing on Asian culture locally and sharing it with the world.

Exhibitions
 TADAO ANDO: ENDEAVORS (2022-06-03 to 2022-09-13)
 The 5th Anniversary of Jut Art Museum 《LIVES: Life, Survival, Living》(2022-03-19 to 2022-07-31)
 Drawing Ambience: Alvin Boyarsky and the Architectural Association (2021-05-08 to 2021-12-05)
Kengo Kuma: Place / Inspiration (2021-07-24 to 2021-09-12)
Agravic Starry Sky—Off-Site Project (2019-06-21 to 2021-12-31)
Broken Landscapes: Have Our Cities Failed? (2021-01-09 to 2021-04-18)
SOS Brutalism—Save the Concrete Monsters! (2020-07-04 to 2020-11-29)
Paradise Lost – Gazing at Contemporary Urban Civilization and its Metaphor (2019-12-21 to 2020-04-05)
DIALOGUES: Oyler Wu Collaborative (2019-07-20 to 2019-11-17)
HUMAN NATURE: Generosity and Its Form Akihisa HIRATA (2019-03-16 to 2019-06-23)
The Flying Land (2018-10-06 to 2019-01-20)
ZERO CITY—Marco Casagrande: Who Cares, Wins the Third Generation City (2018-04-21 to 2018-08-05)
HOME 2028 (Kaohsiung Museum of Fine Arts) (2018-03-10 to 2018-06-18)
A Decade: Our Urban Imagination and Adventures (2017-10-21 to 2018-02-25)
 A Nonexistent Place (2017-04-08 to 2017-08-06)
 Home 2025 (2016-10-22 to 2017-01-15)

Transportation
MRT

Zhongxiao Xinsheng Station(Exit No.4), 10-minute walk.

Zhongxiao Fuxing Station(Exit No.1), 10-minute walk.

BUS

Jut Art Museum Bus-stop, routes 669, 919.

National Taipei University of Technology(Jianguo) Bus-stop, routes 202 Shuttle, 298, R57.

YOUBIKE

Bade Market Station, 1-minute walk.

PARKING

There is no parking space in the Jut Art Museum, please use the nearby public or commercial parking lot.

See also
 List of museums in Taiwan

References

External links
 

2016 establishments in Taiwan
Art museums and galleries in Taiwan
Museums established in 2016
Museums in Taipei